Mirrors in Your Eyes is the third studio album by American shoegaze band Soundpool, released April 27, 2010 on Killer Pimp. The album was noted for its unusual blend of shoegaze and disco.

Music videos were produced for the title track and "Kite of Love".

Track listing

References

External links

2010 albums
Soundpool albums